Afrasura discreta is a moth of the  subfamily Arctiinae which is endemic to Guinea.

References

External links

discreta
Moths described in 2009
Endemic fauna of Guinea
Erebid moths of Africa